Ernst Wilhelm Hildebrand (8 March 1833, Falkenberg, Heideblick - 17 November 1924, Berlin) was a German painter. Many art websites mistakenly identify him as "Swiss".

Biography 
He was the son of a landowner who later became the station master of Sorau. His first art lessons came from Carl Steffeck in Berlin where, after a year spent on a study trip to Paris, he would decide to live. In 1875, he became a Professor at the Academy of Fine Arts, Karlsruhe and, the following year, was appointed Professor of figure painting. Later, he also taught genre, history and portrait painting. His notable students there included Carl Röchling, Friedrich Kallmorgen and Pedro Weingärtner.

In 1880, at the suggestion of Anton von Werner, he was appointed to succeed Karl Gussow at the Prussian Academy of Arts. However, in 1885 he gave up teaching for health reasons. He remained a member of the academy and was elected to several terms on the academic Senate.
 
Initially, he focused on decorative painting, but soon turned to genre scenes, featuring Martin Luther and Queen Louise. In the 1890s, he once again switched styles, this time to portrait painting.

He also made himself welcome at court, where he produced canvases of the Grand Duke and Duchess of Baden and the Crown Prince (later Emperor) Frederick III. He also painted several portraits of University professors (including Arthur Auwers and Karl Möbius). Later, he ventured into painting scenes from history (Tullia Minor driving her team of horses over her father's corpse) and literature (such as Gretchen in Prison, a scene from Goethe's Faust).

His brother Max Hildebrand, was an engineer and inventor who made several improvements to geodetic and astronomical instruments.

References

Further reading 
 Ernst Hildebrand (Maler). In: Ulrich Thieme, Felix Becker et al.: Allgemeines Lexikon der Bildenden Künstler von der Antike bis zur Gegenwart. Vol.27, E. A. Seemann, Leipzig 1933, S. 75.
 Irmgard Wirth: Berliner Malerei im 19. Jahrhundert. Siedler Verlag, Berlin 1990, S. 339.

External links

1833 births
1924 deaths
People from Falkenberg/Elster
People from the Province of Saxony
19th-century German painters
19th-century German male artists
German male painters
20th-century German painters
20th-century German male artists
Academic staff of the Prussian Academy of Arts
Academic staff of the Academy of Fine Arts, Karlsruhe